Mohana (Sl. No.: 136) is a Vidhan Sabha constituency in Gajapati district, Odisha.

This constituency includes Mohana block, Udayagiri block, Nuagada block and Rayagada block.

Elected Members

Thirteen elections were held between 1961 and 2014.
Elected members from the Mohana constituency are:
2019: (136): Dasarathi Gamango (Congress)
2014: (136): Basanti Mallick (BJD)
2009: (136): Chakradhara Paik (Congress)
2004: (77): Srujya Narayan Patro (BJD)
2000: (77): Srujya Narayan Patro (BJD)
1995: (77): Srujya Narayan Patro (Janata Dal)
1990: (77): Srujya Narayan Patro (Janata Dal)
1985: (77): Sarat Kumar Jena (Congress)
1980: (77): Udayanarayan Deb (JNP (SC))
1977: (77): Udayanarayan Deb (Independent)
1974: (77): Udayanarayan Deb (Utkal Congress)
1971: (73): Bhimasena Mandal (Congress)
1967: (73): Tarini Sardar (Congress)
1961: (16): Biswanath Naik (Congress)

2019 Election Result

2014 Election Result
In 2014 election, Biju Janata Dal candidate Basanti Mallick defeated  Indian National Congress candidate Dasarathi Gamango by a margin of 115 votes.

2009 Election Results

Notes

References

Assembly constituencies of Odisha
Gajapati district